Dim Tu Tac (Chinese: 點都得) is a Chinese dim sum restaurant chain in Ho Chi Minh City, Vietnam.  'Dim tu tac' means "anything you want or anything is possible" in Chinese.  This translates through the restaurant's mission of exploring various possibilities through innovative cooking techniques and culturally inspired ingredients.

Food 
Dim Tu Tac cooks their dishes using carefully chosen and use non-pre-processed ingredients. The restaurant inspects their raw ingredients daily to ensure consistency in freshness and quality. One of the most used ingredients is shrimp, which is incorporated into many of its menu items. The chefs at Dim Tu Tac cook using various Cantonese traditional methods of processing food like steaming, stir frying, roasting, and grilling. 

Their menu consists of a wide range of dim sum, appetizers, BBQ, soup, rice & noodles, vegetarian, family-style dishes, drinks and desserts. Dim Tu Tac offers monthly and seasonal menus at different branches. As in other contemporary and fusion-based restaurants, chefs sometimes blend different ingredients and preparation methods to create new dishes, which are culturally inspired.

Chefs 
Most of the chefs are international who come from other Asian countries like Hong Kong and different parts of China. At each different branch, there are numerous chefs who are split up based on their region and specialities. These chefs from different branches then travel to the other locations on a weekly basis to perform tests and trainings with the goal of maintaining the restaurant's standards.

Locations 
 Dim Tu Tac District 1: 55 Dong Du Street, Ward Ben Nghe, District 1. 
 Dim Tu Tac District 1: Saigon Centre 6th floor, 65 Le Loi, Ward Ben Nghe, District 1. 
 Dim Tu Tac District 5: 29B Tran Hung Dao Street, Ward 6, District 5. 
 Dim Tu Tac District 7: 116A Nguyen Huu Tho Street, Ward Phuoc Kien, Nha Be. 
 Dim Tu Tac District 10: 16A Le Hong Phong Street, Ward 12, District 10. 
 Dim Tu Tac District Phu Nhuan: Tan Son Nhat Hotel 2nd floor, 202 Hoang Van Thu Street, Ward 9, Phu Nhuan District.

References

External links

Restaurants in Vietnam